= Acalica =

Bolivian mythological creatures

Acalica are mythological creatures (sometimes called "weather-fairies") from Bolivia. They are said to control the weather, live in caves, and are very rarely seen. When they do appear they are said to take the form of small, wizened men.
